Jinjunmei (金駿眉) is a celebrated black tea from the Wuyi Mountains in Fujian Province, China. It is made exclusively from the buds plucked in early spring from the tea plant. The buds are subsequently fully oxidized and then roasted to yield a tea that has a sweet, fruity and flowery flavour with a long-lasting sweet after-taste. The brew is bright reddish in colour. It is a representative of high-end black tea in Fujian and has now become one of the most expensive varieties of black tea in China.

History
In 2005, a group of tea enthusiasts from Beijing visited Tongmu village in Nanping County and proposed using buds to make the highest grade of Zhengshan Xiaozhong black tea. In the same year, Jin Jun Mei was first developed by Jiang Yuanxun, Chairman of Wuyi Mountains Zhengshan Tea Industry in Fujian and his team of tea makers led by Liang Junde, a master tea maker. Jin Jun Mei basically follows the traditional manufacturing process of Zhengshan Xiaozhong, while only picking the fresh buds from Tongmu Village.

Flavor
The tea has a sweet taste and is very resistant to brewing. It can be brewed 12 times and the taste remains full and sweet.

References

Black tea
Wuyi tea